The eleventh season of the American television series Whose Line Is It Anyway? premiered on The CW on April 17, 2015, and concluded on October 5, 2015.

Cast

Recurring 
 Jeff Davis (six episodes)
 Gary Anthony Williams (three episodes)
 Keegan-Michael Key (three episodes)
 Brad Sherwood (three episodes)
 Greg Proops (two episodes)
 Heather Anne Campbell (two episodes)
 Jonathan Mangum (one episode)

Episodes 

"Winner(s)" of each episode as chosen by host Aisha Tyler are highlighted in italics. The winner(s) perform a sketch during the credit roll, just like in the original UK series.

References

External links
Whose Line Is It Anyway? (U.S.) (a Titles & Air Dates Guide)
Mark's guide to Whose Line is it Anyway? - Episode Guide

Whose Line Is It Anyway?
2015 American television seasons